The Lancaster School District is a school district that serves a major part of the city of Lancaster, California (USA).

The Lancaster School District was first formed in 1885. Approximately 15,500 students are enrolled in the Lancaster School District. The district consists of 21 schools:
 1 Preschool
 14 Elementary schools
 4 Junior high schools
 1 Alternative education school
 1 Special education school

The Lancaster School District serves Kindergarten through the 8th grade. All public high school level education (9th – 12th grades) in the metropolitan area is provided by the Antelope Valley Union High School District.

List of schools
Most of the district's  lies within the City of Lancaster with a small portion in the unincorporated boundaries of the Los Angeles County. All Lancaster School District school properties are located within the city limits of Lancaster.

Elementary schools
Desert View Elementary School
Discovery School
El Dorado Elementary School 
Jack Northrop Elementary School
Joshua Elementary School
Lincoln Elementary School
Linda Verde Elementary School
Mariposa Computer Science Magnet School 
Mller Elementary School 
Monte Vista Elementary School
Nancy Cory Elementary School
Sierra Elementary School
Sunnydale Elementary School
West Wind Elementary School

Junior high schools
Amargosa Creek Middle School
Endeavour Middle School
Fulton & Alsbury Academy
New Vista Middle School
Piute Middle School

Alternative education schools
The Leadership Academy (Formerly: Crossroads Alternative School)

Special education schools
The Promise Academy(Formerly: Linda Verde Center)

See also

 Drennan v. Star Paving Co.: A court case involving the construction of Monte Vista Elementary School
 List of school districts in California

References

External links
 Lancaster School District

Education in Lancaster, California
School districts in Los Angeles County, California
School districts established in 1885
1885 establishments in California